Sand Point  is a community in the Canadian province of Nova Scotia, located in  Colchester County and just outside of Tatamagouche. It is a small piece of land that juts out into the Tatamagouche Bay. There are numerous cottages and a handful of houses on Sand Point. There used to be a small farm at the end of Sand Point.

References
 Sand Point on Destination Nova Scotia

Communities in Colchester County
General Service Areas in Nova Scotia